Old Bexley and Sidcup is a constituency created in 1983 and represented in the House of Commons of the UK Parliament represented since 2021 by Louie French of the Conservative Party.

History and profile
The seat was created in 1983 by combining a small part of the abolished seat of Bexleyheath, chiefly Old Bexley, with the abolished seat of Sidcup.

On 29 January 2008 the Conservative Party withdrew the whip from the MP Derek Conway following alleged misuse of funds revealed by the MPs expenses controversy, who declined to resign as MP and became an Independent. He retired from national politics in 2010.

Sir Edward Heath (prime minister of the United Kingdom 1970–1974) held this area (also referring to its main predecessor seat, Sidcup) from 1950 until 2001 when he retired at the age of 84, at the time the longest-serving MP in the Commons.

Political overview
The seat has been won at general elections since creation by the Conservative Party candidate.  The 1997 New Labour Landslide saw the party's majority fall to its lowest level of 7% of the vote.  Its greatest level has to date been 41.5% of the vote — in 1987.

In 2010 the seat was won by the Conservative James Brokenshire, who had transferred to this seat and approved by his local party when his former seat of Hornchurch was abolished in boundary changes.  His 2015 result made the seat the 105th safest of the Conservative Party's 331 seats by percentage of majority.  The seat was left vacant following Brokenshire's death on 7 October 2021. until a by-election was held on 2 December which resulted in a Conservative hold.

Boundaries
1983–1997: The London Borough of Bexley wards of Blackfen, Blendon and Penhill, Cray, Lamorbey, St Mary's, Sidcup East, and Sidcup West.

1997–2010: The London Borough of Bexley wards of Blackfen, Blendon and Penhill, Cray, Danson, East Wickham, Falconwood, Lamorbey, St Mary's, Sidcup East, and Sidcup West.

2010–present: The London Borough of Bexley wards of Blackfen and Lamorbey, Blendon and Penhill, East Wickham, Falconwood and Welling, Longlands, St Mary's, and Sidcup.

As its name suggests, the seat covers the Bexley and Sidcup areas; it formerly included Danson Park which owing to more development in the south was moved to the Bexleyheath and Crayford constituency.

Constituency profile
Old Bexley and Sidcup has average incomes above the national average, a high proportion of semi-detached and detached homes and low unemployment with a lower than average dependency on social housing.

The constituency generally consists of middle-class and lower middle-class outer London suburbia, served by the Dartford Loop and Bexleyheath commuter railway lines to Central London. Sidcup has been largely developed to neat garden suburb-inspired building schemes for most homes.

Members of Parliament

Elections

Elections in the 2020s

Elections in the 2010s

Elections in the 2000s

Elections in the 1990s

Elections in the 1980s

See also
List of parliamentary constituencies in London

References

External links 
Politics Resources (Election results from 1922 onwards)
Electoral Calculus (Election results from 1955 onwards)



Politics of the London Borough of Bexley
Parliamentary constituencies in London
Constituencies of the Parliament of the United Kingdom established in 1983
Sidcup